Se llamaba SN is a 1977 film directed by Venezuelan filmmaker Luis Correa. The film is based in the homonymous 1964 novel by José Vicente Abreu, which serves as a testimony and denounces the dictatorship of Marcos Pérez Jiménez in the country.

Plot 
During the dictatorship of Marcos Pérez Jiménez in Venezuela, his secret police, the National Security, 
detains thousands of Venezuelans. In 1952, a political prisoner is sent at a prison located on an island a faces the conditions in jail.

Release 
The film was screened at the 25th San Sebastián International Film Festival, in 1977.

References

External links 
 

1977 films
1970s Spanish-language films
1970s historical films
Venezuelan drama films
Films set in the 1950s